Albert Edward Wiggam (October 8, 1871 – April 26, 1957) was an American psychologist and eugenicist. He was called "one of the most influential promoters of eugenic thought" and a "gifted showman," which made him a popular lecturer.

Early life and education

Albert Wiggam was born in Austin, Indiana on October 8, 1871. His parents were Harriet Small Jackson and John Wiggam. Wiggam earned two degrees at Hanover College: a Bachelor of Science in 1893 and a Master of Arts in 1903.

Career

After college, Wiggam worked as a newspaper reporter, writing for the Minneapolis Journal, and as an assayer at a mine. In 1896, he moved to Denver, Colorado where he operated a greenhouse. He became the first person to telegraph flowers. He sold the business within a year.

He received an honorary degree from Colgate University in 1929 and 1932. Wiggam wrote the syndicated psychology column "Let's Explore Your Mind". He served as president of the Association for the Study of Human Heredity. As of 1939, Wiggam and Elizabeth were living in New York while spending the summer at their second home in Vernon, Indiana.

Eugenics

Wiggam became a lecturer for the Chautauqua Institution in 1901.
On April 9, 1902, he married Elizabeth M. Jayne. He also was a lecturer on biology and heredity at the University of Wisconsin. He left Chautauqua in 1919.

In 1925, Wiggam completed The New Decalogue of Science, a pro-eugenics book. The book, and subsequent works by Wiggam, were republished every few years and were popular sellers. In The New Decalogue, Wiggam called eugenics a "new social and political Bible." He quoted Bible passages that he thought reflected eugenic beliefs.

Wiggam's eugenics works and lectures focused on urban environments and individuality versus the rural nuclear families, the latter which were more common in eugenics canon. He considered individuality and personal improvement as an opportunity to improve one's social, moral and economic success.

Wiggam also supported "permanent race improvement" and believed that Americans of Nordic heritage were superior to others. He believed that economically successful people had "good" genes and that African Americans, criminals and immigrants did not have "good" genes. Wiggam did believe that African Americans were better than African people living in Africa. He believes that Black people could not perform "higher integrative processes of the nervous system."

He also believes that men were superior to women. He believed that the greatest achievement women, specifically women of Nordic heritage, could achieve was having "well born" children.

Later life and death

He received an honorary degree from the University of Vermont in 1944. In 1944, he married Helen Scott Holcombe.

He died on April 26, 1957 in California.

Works by Albert E. Wiggam
The New Decalogue of Science. Indianapolis: The Bobbs-Merrill Company, 1923.
The Fruit of the Family Tree. Indianapolis: The Bobbs-Merrill company, 1924. 
The Next Age of Man. Indianapolis: The Bobbs-Merrill company, 1927.
Exploring Your Mind With the Psychologists. New York: Blue Ribbon books, 1928.
The Marks of an Educated Man. Indianapolis: Bobbs-Merrill company, 1930.
The Marks of a Clear Mind; Or, Sorry but You're Wrong About It. New York City: Blue Ribbon Books, 1933.
New Techniques of Happiness. New York: W. Funk, 1948.

References

1871 births
1957 deaths
People from Scott County, Indiana
Hanover College alumni
20th-century American psychologists
American eugenicists
American white supremacists
Chautauqua Institution
People from Vernon, Indiana
University of Wisconsin–Madison faculty
Writers from Indiana